The Pan-Mass Challenge (PMC) is a fundraising bike-a-thon started in 1980 by Billy Starr to benefit the Dana–Farber Cancer Institute via the Jimmy Fund. It raises more money than any other single athletic fundraiser in the country.

History

Starr created the Pan-Mass Challenge in 1980, several years after his mother contracted melanoma.  In its first year, the event raised $10,200 and had 36 riders, who rode from Springfield to Provincetown. The PMC was the first athletic fundraiser to require participants to guarantee their pledges with a personal credit card, a change that caused riders' delinquency rate to fall from 17 percent to 3 percent. The 2022 Pan-Mass Challenge, its 43rd annual event, featured more than 6,400 participants and raised $69 million, the single largest donation in the Dana-Farber Cancer Institute's history.

Notable past riders in the PMC include three-time Super Bowl champion Troy Brown, Joshua Bekenstein (a PMC board member), Dana-Farber CEO Laurie Glimcher, Massachusetts Governor Charlie Baker, Boston mayor Marty Walsh, restaurateur Jody Adams, former Secretary of State John Kerry, Nobel laureate William Kaelin, Senator Scott Brown, Judge Samuel Zoll, Overstock.com CEO Patrick Byrne, and football player Joe Andruzzi.

Format

Each August, cyclists ride for one or two days, on one of 12 routes ranging from 25 to 192 miles long running through 47 Massachusetts towns. The longest route runs from Sturbridge to Provincetown. Some teams have "Pedal Partners", children who are currently receiving cancer treatment via the Jimmy Fund. Riders commit to raising between $600 and $8,000, depending on the route they will be riding. As of 2015, 75 percent of riders had previously participated in the event, and 1,100 had participated for 10 years or more.

In 2016 a new winter event, the PMC Winter Cycle, was created. Since 2018, it has been held inside Fenway Park. In 2022, the event featured hundreds of cyclists on stationary bikes and had a fundraising goal of $500,000.

Local PMC Kids Rides are held throughout the year.

In October 2022, more than 200 riders participated in the first PMC Unpaved event, a one-day, off-road gravel ride in the Berkshires.

Impact

The PMC generates 55% of the Jimmy Fund's annual revenue  and is the Dana–Farber Cancer Institute's single largest donor. From 1980 to 2022, the event has raised a total of $900 million. This funding has been directed to cancer care and research, including helping fund the development of 41 cancer drugs. Since 2007, 100 percent of the money raised by riders goes to the Dana–Farber Cancer Institute, with all event overhead funded by sponsors, entry fees, and other income. In 2018, 200 sponsors provided $7 million in support.

Since its inception, the PMC has inspired various other athletic fundraising events that followed it, like Relay for Life for the American Cancer Society and Pelotonia for the James Cancer Center in Columbus, Ohio. , the Peer-to-Peer Professional Forum ranked the PMC as joint third-largest "a-thon" fundraiser, and the PMC grosses more than any other single event fundraiser.

References

Cancer fundraisers
Charities based in Massachusetts
1980 establishments in Massachusetts
Organizations established in 1980